Doris Agbayani Bigornia (born February 17, 1966) is a Filipina journalist, field reporter, and news presenter.

Career
Bigornia is a journalist and field reporter for ABS-CBN News. After her departure in 2007, she worked as a freelance reporter.  In 2013, she made her comeback with ABS-CBN. Bigornia confirmed her return on her personal Twitter account. On December 21, 2017, she was injured along with her coworker and four others in a car accident when a Montero Sport suddenly crashed into her news car along with a motorcycle and 5 cars in EDSA-Shaw underpass. 

On May 15, 2020, during an interview with Ayala Malls president Jennylle Tupaz on TeleRadyo's SRO: Suhestyon, Reaksyon at Opinyon, Bigornia's two cats, Bella and Nala began fighting. Bigornia's daughter Nikki provided context to the scrape by sharing the footage on social media, along with the caption: "MY CATS HAVE NO CHILL". The clip eventually went viral and was picked up by international news and entertainment outlets.

On December 19, 2020, Metropolitan Manila Development Authority (MMDA) Assistant Secretary Celine Pialago called Bigornia a demon after a misleading news about the re-opening of Dario Bridge in Quezon City.

On February 23, 2021, Bigornia suffered from a heart attack, and underwent a heart surgery.

References

External links

Doris Bigornia speaks up on alleged misbehavior at concert

Living people
Filipino radio journalists
Filipino television journalists
1966 births
People from Metro Manila
ABS-CBN News and Current Affairs people